Wattegedara is a village located in Western Sri Lanka. It is located within Central Province.

See also
List of towns in Central Province, Sri Lanka

External links

Populated places in Central Province, Sri Lanka